Earl Scott was an American football and basketball coach.  He served as the head football and basketball coach at Valparaiso University during the 1927–28 and 1928–29 academic years.

Head coaching record

References

Year of birth missing
Year of death missing
Valparaiso Beacons football coaches
Valparaiso Beacons men's basketball coaches